Henry William Forster, 1st Baron Forster,  (31 January 1866 – 15 January 1936) was a British politician who served as the seventh Governor-General of Australia, in office from 1920 to 1925. He had previously been a government minister under Arthur Balfour, H. H. Asquith, and David Lloyd George.

Forster was born in Catford, Kent. He attended Eton College and New College, Oxford, and in his youth played first-class cricket – in later life he served a term as president of the Marylebone Cricket Club. Forster was elected to the House of Commons in 1892, representing the Conservative Party. He was a Junior Lord of the Treasury under Arthur Balfour from 1902 to 1905, and later Financial Secretary to the War Office from 1915 to 1919. Forster was raised to the peerage in 1919, and appointed Governor-General of Australia the following year. Unlike his predecessor, Ronald Munro Ferguson, he faced no constitutional challenges and had no influence on the political scene. Forster travelled widely while in office and was popular among the general public, mainly concerning himself with ceremonial duties. He retired to England at the end of his five-year term.

Background and education
Forster was born at Southend Hall, Catford, Kent, the son of Major John Forster, an Army officer. He was educated at Eton and New College, Oxford. He was a first-class cricketer who played for Oxford University and Hampshire, as well as for various amateur teams as a lower-order right-handed batsman and an orthodox left-arm spin bowler. He served as president of the Marylebone Cricket Club. He was also keen on yachting and horse-racing.

Political career
Forster entered the House of Commons as Member of Parliament (MP) for Sevenoaks at the 1892 general election. He held that seat until 1918, when he was elected for the new Bromley constituency. In 1901, he was appointed a deputy lieutenant of Kent. He served as a Junior Lord of the Treasury from August 1902 to 1905 in the Conservative Government of Arthur Balfour, and as Financial Secretary to the War Office from 1915 to 1919 in the wartime coalition government. In 1919 he was elevated to the peerage as Baron Forster, of Lepe in the County of Southampton.

Governor-General of Australia
In June 1920 Forster was offered the post of Governor-General of Australia, which he accepted. Shortly afterwards, on 28 June 1920, he was appointed Knight Grand Cross of the Order of St Michael and St George (GCMG). This was the first occasion on which the Australian government was genuinely consulted about the appointment of a Governor-General. The Colonial Secretary, Lord Milner, sent the Prime Minister, Billy Hughes, two other suggested appointments before Hughes approved of Forster. Hughes seems to have preferred Forster because he was a man of modest reputation whom he thought he could control. His reputation as a sportsman was also an asset.

Forster arrived in October 1920. He found that the congenial atmosphere of pre-war Australian politics had been shattered by the bitter battles of the wartime period. Hughes's Nationalist Party dominated the political scene. The Labor Party had moved to the left in opposition and was now anti-imperialist and pacifist, and more markedly socialist.

But Forster played almost no direct role in Australian politics during his five years in the country. There was only one change of government during his term, when Hughes was replaced by Stanley Bruce in February 1923, and Forster took no part in the manoeuverings that led to the change. As Australia became more independent and more confident in its international relations, the role of the Governor-General as an overseer and intermediary declined. Forster's predecessor, Ronald Munro Ferguson, had resisted this trend, but Forster was not a strong enough personality to do so.

Instead Forster's role became more like that of a modern Governor-General: opening fetes, visiting hospitals, attending sporting events, hosting balls and banquets. As a result, he became considerably more popular than most of his predecessors, but exercised less real influence than any of them. Forster and his wife Rachel devoted themselves to charities, and Forster spent much time travelling to all the states and country areas, unveiling war memorials and making patriotic speeches. The day of the decorative Governor-General had arrived.

In 1925, a new women's hospital in Redfern, Sydney was named the "Rachel Forster Hospital for Women" in Lady Forster's honour. The hospital is now closed and the former site has been redeveloped. There is a "Lady Forster Kindergarten" in Elwood, Victoria, named after Lady Forster who was a leading supporter.

The Forsters departed Australia in October 1925, well liked but unremarked.

Family
Lord Forster married the Honourable Rachel Cecily Douglas-Scott-Montagu, daughter of the 1st Baron Montagu of Beaulieu, on 3 June 1890. After Forster's return from Australia they settled near Southampton, and lived quietly until Forster's death in 1936. Lady Forster was invested as a Dame Grand Cross of the Order of the British Empire (GBE) in the 1926 New Years Honours List. She was also invested as a Dame of Grace of the Order of St. John of Jerusalem.

They had two sons, John Forster and Alfred Henry Forster, who were both killed in the First World War, and two daughters, Dorothy Charlotte Forster and Emily Rachel Forster who married George Pitt-Rivers (his first marriage). As Lord Forster had no surviving sons, the barony of Forster became extinct on his death.

Henry Forster died on 15 January 1936 in London, aged 69. Rachel, Lady Foster, GBE, died on 12 April 1962, aged 93 or 94.

Arms

Notes

External links 

 
Cricinfo profile: Henry Forster
Lady Forster Kindergarten – Port Melbourne, Australia

1866 births
1936 deaths
Conservative Party (UK) MPs for English constituencies
Barons in the Peerage of the United Kingdom
Governors-General of Australia
Knights Grand Cross of the Order of St Michael and St George
People from Catford
Members of the Privy Council of the United Kingdom
Alumni of New College, Oxford
Deputy Lieutenants of Kent
English cricketers
Hampshire cricketers
Oxford University cricketers
UK MPs 1892–1895
UK MPs 1895–1900
UK MPs 1900–1906
UK MPs 1906–1910
UK MPs 1910
UK MPs 1910–1918
UK MPs 1918–1922
UK MPs who were granted peerages
I Zingari cricketers
Gentlemen cricketers
Marylebone Cricket Club cricketers
Presidents of the Marylebone Cricket Club
Gentlemen of England cricketers
Oxford and Cambridge Universities cricketers
C. I. Thornton's XI cricketers
A. J. Webbe's XI cricketers
Barons created by George V
Henry
People educated at Eton College